Mater Academy Charter Middle/High School (often called Mater by students and alumni) is a highly selective, coeducational charter school for day students in grades 6 through 12, and offers more than twenty-seven AP courses to students. Located in Hialeah Gardens, Florida, it ranks #33 in the state, and #331 in the nation.

Performing Arts Pavilion
The Performing Arts Pavilion, adjacent to the main campus, was completed in February 2007 and initiated in April 2007. The building provides classroom and multimedia support for the main campus. Classes such as Guitar and Beginning Band are held in the building. It is also used to host presentations by guests, one notable example being Pitbull, faculty meetings, and administrative functions. The Pavilion also includes space for outdoors eating and vending machines.

Other building additions
Since its opening in 2002, the school's campus has been substantially expanded, with one of the earliest of additions being a new building to the north of the main one. Early in the 2014–2015 school year, two new buildings were opened on campus, one of which was dedicated to Mater Academy's sister school, Mater Academy Charter Elementary School. Further expansions continue to take place, primarily to the main building. Including the addition of the new building, the STEM Building.

Recognitions
Mater Academy won the Silver Medal from U.S. News & World Report's America's Best High Schools two years in a row, and the College Board's 2011 Inspiration Award. In the 2008–2009 school year, the Middle School, High School, and Performing Arts and Entertainment Academy divisions all received an "A" rating in the state's FCAT examination.

Notable alumni
Albert Almora, MLB outfielder for the Chicago Cubs
Julio Horrego, Honduran swimmer & Olympic representative
Andrew Cabezas, MLB pitcher for the Minnesota Twins
Zack Moss, NFL running back for the Buffalo Bills

References

External links
 Mater Academy Middle/High Charter School
 Mater Academy Charter Elementary School
 Miami-Dade County Public Schools

Miami-Dade County Public Schools
Educational institutions established in 2002
High schools in Miami-Dade County, Florida
Public high schools in Florida
Public middle schools in Florida
Charter schools in Florida
2002 establishments in Florida